The Sydney Heat are in the East Coast Super League. The team is based in Sydney, Australia.

History
The Sydney Heat were founded in September 2002 following the announcement by Ice Hockey Australia of the formation of the Australian Junior Ice Hockey League. The team is controlled by the New South Wales Ice Hockey Association. On 14 October 2012 it was announced that Sydney Bears player Steven Adams and Paul Kelly had signed on as coaches for the 2012–13 AJIHL season.

Season by season results

Roster
For the 2012–13 AJIHL season

References

2002 establishments in Australia
East Coast Super League
Ice hockey teams in Australia
Organizations established in 2002
Ice hockey clubs established in 2002
Sports teams in Sydney